Mongleath is a hamlet in the parish of Budock, Cornwall, England.

References

Hamlets in Cornwall